Liam Heffernan is an Irish actor, theater director and musician best known for his lead role in the critically acclaimed film The Clash of the Ash (1987), and later as the traveller Blackie Connors in the long running RTÉ television drama series Glenroe.

Heffernan's music career began in the early 1980s as the guitarist with Mean Features, who were active during Cork city's post-punk scene. He is currently the lead singer and a guitarist with Big Boy Foolish.

Career
Born in Cork city in the early 1960s, Heffernan's acting career began in 1984 with appearances in various theater parts with the Graffiti Theatre Company. He moved to Dublin in 1986, and played roles in the films The Stranger Within (1990) and The Boy from Mercury (1996). He has since featured in multiple stage productions and television dramas, including full time roles in Ros na Rún and later Fair City, where he played the returned emigrant Luke Dillon.

He directed the award winning 2000 play "Tillsonburg" for Dublin's Focus Theatre and Cork's The Everyman Palace, and in 2003 directed  "Brilliant Traces" for the Dublin Fringe Festival. In 2010 he appeared in a well regarded production of Billy Roche's play "The Cavalcaders".
His music career began in the early 1980s as the guitarist with Mean Features, who were active during the Cork city post-punk scene for several years, initially as part of the bands centered around the Arcadia Ballroom. The band featured Mick Lynch on vocals and were included on the seminal 1981 live compilation Kaught at the Kampus, described in 2020 by journalist Mike McGrath-Bryan of the Irish Examiner as a "record has come to be regarded as a document of the Cork music scene at an important juncture, helping to set the tone for the city's subsequent musical reputation, with many of the musicians and personalities involved becoming cult figures in their own right."

Heffernan is currently the lead singer and a guitarist with Big Boy Foolish longside guitarist Ricky Dineen. In June 2020, Big Boy Foolish released their debut single "Horsey!", described by Mike McGrath Bryan of The Evening Echo as continuing Dineen's sound "along a grinning, black-humored trajectory". McGrath in 2021 wrote that "unsatisfied with nostalgia, the pair have spent the last number of years cultivating a body of idiosyncratic, drum machine-propelled tunes that sit somewhere to the left of the current wave of genre revivalism." Their second single, "Up the Airy", was released in August 2020. Their fourth single "Nunzerkat" was released in January 2021.

Selected roles

References

Sources

External links
 
 Profile at the Nolan Muldoon Agency
 Big Boy Foolish @ twitter                                                 
 Big Boy Foolish @ Facebook

20th-century Irish male actors
Living people
Irish male film actors
Irish male stage actors
Irish male television actors
Place of birth missing (living people)
Year of birth missing (living people)